The Institute for National Security Studies (INSS) is an independent Israeli research institute and think tank affiliated with Tel Aviv University dealing in areas of national security matters such as military and strategic affairs, terrorism and low intensity conflict, military balance in the Middle East, and cyber warfare.

Headed by economist and former Knesset member Manuel Trajtenberg, INSS research is published worldwide including in books, academic articles, news media, and used by government officials. INSS holds seminars and conferences in various fields of strategic affairs such as the annual Defensive Cyber Intelligence Security conference and Aerial Threat Seminar. Additionally, INSS publishes peer reviewed journals including Military and Strategic Affairs.

In the University of Pennsylvania's 2019 Global Go To Think Tanks Report, INSS was ranked as the best think tank in the Middle East and North Africa. Among all think tanks worldwide, it ranked 12th among "Top Defense and National Security Think Tanks". The institute's study "The History of Israeli-Palestinian Negotiations" was among the list of "Best Policy Study/Report Produced by a Think Tank" for the 2013-2014 term.

History

Originally, INSS was founded as the Center for Strategic Studies in 1977, as part of Tel Aviv University. General (ret.) Aharon Yariv, former IDF Military Intelligence Chief, 1964–1972, was the founding father of Center for Strategic Studies and headed the Institute until his death in 1994. The Center served as a pioneer in redefining the field of Israeli security studies and producing research in the fields of defense and national security that began being used by academic and policy makers.

In 1983, the Center changed its name to the Jaffee Center for Strategic Studies, following a donation from Melvin Jaffee who resided in California.

In October 2006, the Jaffee Center changed its name to the Institute for National Security Studies, after INSS was officially granted independence from the Tel Aviv University and became an affiliate. Additionally, the contribution from Frank Lowy, INSS transferred to a renovated building near Tel Aviv University on Haim Levanon Street 40, Tel Aviv. Until 2021, the INSS was led by Major General (ret.) Amos Yadlin, and the current Executive Director is Manuel Trajtenberg, the former head of the National Economic Council and Member of Knesset for the Zionist Union party.

Research programs
INSS is a publisher and conducts research in a variety of areas, specializing on issues relevant to the national security. The results of INSS work are published in books, articles, special reports and memos. Most of the publications are published in Hebrew and English. They are distributed in print to subscribers, sent via hardcopy to key decision makers in the Israeli government, as well as uploaded electronically to INSS website. Likewise, the Institute hosts seminars and conferences on various security topics. Open to the public, the conferences are taken and recorded, allowing anyone to watch them online.

Journal
The ISSN publishes the quarterly Strategic Assessment: A Multidisciplinary Journal on National Security, dealing with original research on national security topics.

Chechic Award
The Chechic Award is given annually for the most outstanding research in security studies.

See also
National Security College (Israel)

References

Organizations established in 1977
Institute for National Security Studies (Israel)
Foreign policy and strategy think tanks